Robert Byrne James (September 2, 1905 – August 1, 1994) was a Major League Baseball infielder who played three seasons for the Boston Braves and New York Giants in the National League from 1929 to 1930 and 1933.

In 114 games over three seasons, James posted a .257 batting average (61-for-237) with 35 runs, 1 home run, 20 RBI and 8 stolen bases. Defensively, he recorded an overall .943 fielding percentage.

References

External links 
Baseball Reference profile

1905 births
1994 deaths
Baseball players from Texas
New York Giants (NL) players
Boston Braves players